Thomas Widdrington (born 1 October 1971) is an English former football player and manager who is currently manager of  club King's Lynn Town.

As a midfielder, he made 372 appearances in the English Football League in a 15-year career, before spending five years in non-league football. His career began at Southampton in 1990, where he spent the first six years of his career most of which were in the Premier League. In 1996, he moved to Grimsby Town, helping the "Mariners" to the League Trophy and promotion out of the Second Division in 1998. The next year he moved on to Port Vale for a two-year spell. Voted the club's Player of the Year in 2000, he captained the "Valiants" to the League Trophy in 2001. Later in the year he was transferred to Hartlepool United, helping the club to win promotion out of League Two in 2002–03, before he moved on to Macclesfield Town. In 2005 his career in the Football League ended back at Port Vale. He then spent 2005 to 2010 at non-league Salisbury City. As a player, he enjoyed promotion four times with three clubs, and lifted the Football League Trophy twice.

Player-manager at Salisbury City for the 2009–10 season, he returned to the Football League at Southend United, as assistant manager but left the position in December 2010. He was appointed Hemel Hempstead Town manager in October 2011, before he was put it charge at Eastbourne Borough in February 2012. He left Eastbourne Borough in April 2017 and went on to work as head of recruitment at Coventry City and Bristol Rovers, before becoming caretaker-manager of the latter in November 2020. He returned to full-time management at King's Lynn Town in December 2021.

Playing career

Southampton
Born in Newcastle upon Tyne, Widdrington started his career as a Southampton schoolboy trainee at the age of fifteen, having been scouted by the man who brought Alan Shearer to the club, Jack Hixon. He signed a professional contract with the First Division club in May 1990. He enjoyed a short loan spell at Third Division club Wigan Athletic at the start of the 1991–92 season. Ian Branfoot handed him his "Saints" debut at Everton on 1 March 1992.

A tough, no-nonsense midfield player, he survived some frantic managerial changes to carve out a respectable Premier League career over a four-year period for Southampton. He did not become a regular player until the 1994–95 season, when he made 28 league appearances without scoring as the "Saints" finished tenth in the league. He made a further 21 appearances in the 1995–96 season, scoring twice, as the "Saints" narrowly avoided relegation, but still reached the quarter finals of the FA Cup.

He was not far short of making 100 appearances in total when, in July 1996, Grimsby Town came in with a club record offer of £300,000 – as "Saints" had yet another new manager in Graeme Souness. Widdrington decided to accept their terms and headed to Blundell Park.

Grimsby Town
Grimsby were a struggling First Division side, and suffered relegation at the end of the 1996–97 campaign, though Widdrington did score a memorable goal past Southend United on the last day of the season. They enjoyed an immediate return in 1997–98 after winning the play-off Final against Northampton Town 1–0. However injury meant that he missed out on the League Trophy Final victory over AFC Bournemouth at Wembley. Widdrington played his last game for the "Mariners" towards the end of the 1998–99 season, when he was loaned out to Port Vale for the final three months of the season.

Port Vale
At the end of the 1998–99 season Port Vale signed Widdrington (now out of contract, and transfer–listed) on a free transfer. He was sent off on the final day of the 1998–99 season, and he returned to action in 1999–2000 by getting sent off in the opening minute of a 4–2 defeat at Birmingham City. Supporters voted him Player of the Year for the 1999–2000 season, as the "Valiants" suffered relegation into the Second Division.

Manager Brian Horton appointed Widdrington as club-captain for the 2000–01 season. He played every game of the club's League Trophy run, but played no part in the final. He made just over 80 appearances at Vale Park, before being released at the end of the 2000–01 season.

Later career
Linked with Colchester United, Widdrington instead moved north to join up with Hartlepool United. He was a regular for the club and earned promotion to the Second Division with the club in the 2002–03 season, before he was released upon its conclusion.

In July 2003 he was targeted by Oxford United, but instead Widdrington made his next port of call at Macclesfield Town, managed by former boss Brian Horton. He settled in quickly and became an indispensable player for the Third Division strugglers, acting as their captain for the 2004–05 season. In January 2005, Horton put him on the transfer list, and Widdrington then decided to call it a day at Macclesfield and in a twist, joined former club Port Vale on a non-contract basis.

Style of play
Widdrington was a midfielder, but could also fill in at full-back. He was tough and combative.

Coaching career

Salisbury City
Widdrington joined Salisbury City in February 2005. His capture from Port Vale was an integral part of the club's development under manager Nick Holmes, helping the club to the highest point in its history. Over time his role became that of a coach, rather than a player.

On 8 September 2007, Widdrington was involved in a touchline incident with Rushden & Diamonds boss Garry Hill. The pair began arguing and Hill headbutted Widdrington, breaking his nose. Both men received fines from their clubs and Hill was also given a ten match touchline ban and a fine of £1,500. Later that year Widdrington was suspended by the club pending an 'internal disciplinary inquiry', but was soon allowed to return to work, with a statement being released saying: "No charges have been brought against Tommy and everyone at the club looks forward to working with him towards continued success." The following year Rushden banned him from Nene Park in the return fixture, despite no authorisation from The Football Association for the action.

He took over as manager in July 2009 after Nick Holmes took the role of general manager. He won the Conference National Manager of the Month award in April 2010. However he left the club after they were expelled from the Conference National due to them entering administration.

Southend United & Hemel Hempstead Town
In July 2010, Widdrington was named assistant to new Southend United manager Paul Sturrock. His employment was terminated on 15 December 2010 as Sturrock needed "a fresh impetus". The club promoted from within in appointing Graham Coughlan as his replacement.

In October 2011, Widdrington was appointed as manager of struggling Southern League side Hemel Hempstead Town. His stay was short, as he found employment at a club in a higher league mid-way through the season.

Eastbourne Borough
In February 2012, Widdrington was appointed as manager of Eastbourne Borough, taking over from long-serving manager Garry Wilson, with the remit of keeping the club in the Conference South. He signed both Ronnie Bull and Stuart Anderson from Salisbury, and both Marvin Hamilton and Ellis Remy from Hemel Hampstead, also bringing in goalkeeper Mitch Walker on loan from Brighton & Hove Albion. They ended the 2011–12 season two places and two points above the drop zone, and went on to finish safely in 12th spot in 2012–13. After an unbeaten start to the 2013–14 season, Widdrington was named as the Conference South Manager of the Month for August. The "Sports" ended the 2013–14 campaign in tenth place.

After guiding Borough to top of the table with four wins and two draws at the start of the 2014–15 season he was named as Conference South Manager of the Month for the second successive August. They ended the campaign in 11th place and then finished 17th in 2015–16. They won the Sussex Senior Challenge Cup in 2016 after beating Worthing 1–0 in the final at Falmer Stadium. He left the club by mutual consent on 7 April 2017, leaving Borough 11th in the National League South table, 20 points clear of relegation and 18 adrift of the play-off places.

Backroom roles
Widdrington was appointed head of recruitment at Coventry City on 10 April 2017. On 1 May 2018, he left Coventry City and took up a similar position at Bristol Rovers. His son, Theo, was signed up two months later. With the aim of recruiting players on a low wage to try and sell on for a profit, he also brought in: Jonson Clarke-Harris, Abu Ogogo, Anssi Jaakkola, Josh Hare, Tom Davies, Mark Little and Luke Leahy. Widdrington become the club's caretaker-manager following the sacking of Ben Garner on 14 November 2020, with Rovers sitting 18th in League One. He oversaw a 4–3 victory over Chelsea U21 in the EFL Trophy on 18 November, before Paul Tisdale was appointed as permanent manager the following day.

On 10 February 2021, Widdrington was once again installed as caretaker manager following the dismissal of Paul Tisdale. He was in this position until Joey Barton was appointed as manager 11 days later, having overseen a 3–1 victory over Portsmouth and a 2–0 defeat to Gillingham. Following the club's relegation to League Two at the end of the 2020–21 season, the Director of Football role was removed from the club's board with Widdrington now taking on the role of Director in charge of outgoing loan deals and "ensuring the strategic vision is followed at all levels throughout the club". As the club moved into the new season, manager Joey Barton and Widdrington had a strained relationship with Barton claiming in October 2021 that he had no relationship with Widdrington or his scouting team. On 3 December 2021, Widdrington departed Bristol Rovers.

King's Lynn Town
On 10 December 2021, Widdrington was appointed manager of King's Lynn Town, who were second-from-bottom of the National League. His first match in charge was the following day and saw his new side defeat bottom side Dover Athletic 2–1 thanks to a double from Josh Barrett whom had been brought in to Bristol Rovers under Widdrington. Lynn's relegation to the National League North was confirmed in the penultimate match of the 2021–22 season with a 3–3 draw with Eastleigh.

An impressive start to life back in the sixth tier saw Widdrington awarded the National League North Manager of the Month award for August 2022 having earned sixteen points from a possible seventeen. King's Lynn knocked League Two side Doncaster Rovers out of the first round of the FA Cup with a 1–0 win at the Eco-Power Stadium.

Personal life
Widdrington celebrated his goal for Port Vale against Brentford on 24 October 2000 with five bottles of Budweiser, and subsequently crashed his BMW into a set of traffic lights in Hanley early the following morning. He was charged with refusing to take part in police drink-driving tests and entered a Guilty plea. He was banned from driving for 12 months and given a £500 fine.

His eldest son Kai is a professional dancer. His younger son, Theo, turned professional at Portsmouth in April 2017.

Career statistics

Managerial statistics

Honours

As a player
Grimsby Town
Football League Second Division play-offs: 1998
Football League Trophy: 1998

Port Vale
Football League Trophy: 2001

Hartlepool United
League Two second-place promotion: 2002–03

Salisbury City
Southern Football League Premier Division: 2005–06
Conference South play-offs: 2007

Individual
Port Vale Player of the Year: 2000

As a manager
Eastbourne Borough
Sussex Senior Challenge Cup: 2016

Individual
Conference National Manager of the Month: April 2010 (Salisbury City)
Conference South Manager of the Month: August 2013, August 2014 (Eastbourne Borough)
National League North Manager of the Month: August 2022

References

1971 births
Living people
Footballers from Newcastle upon Tyne
English footballers
Association football midfielders
Wallsend Boys Club players
Southampton F.C. players
Wigan Athletic F.C. players
Grimsby Town F.C. players
Port Vale F.C. players
Hartlepool United F.C. players
Macclesfield Town F.C. players
Salisbury City F.C. players
Premier League players
English Football League players
English football managers
Salisbury City F.C. managers
Hemel Hempstead Town F.C. managers
Eastbourne Borough F.C. managers
Bristol Rovers F.C. managers
King's Lynn Town F.C. managers
National League (English football) managers
English Football League managers
Association football coaches
Macclesfield Town F.C. non-playing staff
Southend United F.C. non-playing staff
Coventry City F.C. non-playing staff
Bristol Rovers F.C. non-playing staff